Baseball is a growing, minor sport in the United Kingdom, with an estimated 22,500 people playing in 2020.

The sport is governed by the British Baseball Federation, which runs a multi-tier national league. There are also independent regional leagues, and around 20 universities field teams currently in existence. At various times in history professionalism has existed, most notably the 1890 National League of Baseball of Great Britain.

In 1938 the Great Britain national baseball team won the Baseball World Cup, and were runners-up in the 1967 and 2007 European Baseball Championship.  As of 2020 Great Britain competed internationally at under 12, under 15, under 18, under 23 and senior levels. The under 23 team placed fifth at the 2019 European Under 23 Baseball Championship.

Despite relatively low numbers of participation today, historically there have been a number of players born in the United Kingdom to have played in Major League Baseball. Of over 90 players who have played in MLB Danny Cox, Lance Painter and Bobby Thomson are most notable. Thomson hit the Shot Heard 'Round the World that took the New York Giants to the World Series in 1951.

Major League Baseball players born in the United Kingdom
Over 90 players born in the four constituent nations of the United Kingdom and pre partition Ireland have played professionally in Major League Baseball. This does not include players born outside the United Kingdom but of British heritage or players who have played in MLB and represented the Great Britain national baseball team, but who were born outside the United Kingdom.

Inductees to the National Baseball Hall of Fame and Museum
Harry Wright, born in Sheffield, was described by fellow Hall of Fame inductee Harry Chadwick as “the father of professional base ball” and is currently the only United Kingdom born inductee of the National Baseball Hall of Fame and Museum. Although not born in the United Kingdom, George Wright is another inductee of United Kingdom heritage. George is the brother of Harry, and his parents were born in England. Another Hall of Famer who can trace their ancestry back to the United Kingdom is former British national team coach Trevor Hoffman, whose mother was English and whose grandfather was a professional footballer with Southend United.

Major League Baseball players who have represented the United Kingdom
Either through being born in the United Kingdom, via ancestral links to the United Kingdom or qualifying via being born in a Commonwealth member nation, a number of players with MLB experience have represented the United Kingdom internationally, via the Great Britain national baseball team. The most notable recent player is Jazz Chisholm Jr..

History

Origins
It is argued that modern "American baseball" can trace its roots to 18th century Britain, with the earliest known mention and illustration of the game appearing in John Newbery's A Little Pretty Pocket-Book in 1744. The earliest known rules were printed in 1796, in Germany, as "Das Englische Base-ball". For a fuller context of the traditional codes of baseball games in the United Kingdom see British Baseball.

Although early codes of baseball may have originated in the United Kingdom, the American code of baseball, as North Americans would understand it, started to be played in the UK as early as the 1870s and it was fully developed by 1890, when the fully professional 1890 National League of Baseball of Great Britain was established. Since the 1870s many exhibition matches between North American teams have been staged in the United Kingdom, culminating in the MLB London Series in 2019, which sold out 120,000 tickets in less than an hour. As a result, a small number of MLB teams have fan led dedicated fan clubs in the United Kingdom.

American influence in the 19th century

In the 1870s, baseball teams from the United States, including the Boston Red Stockings and Philadelphia Athletics, toured the United Kingdom, in an effort to popularise the sport, but with limited success. At that time, John Wisden and Co. were the most famous supplier of essential baseball equipment, "as used by the baseball clubs now in England in all their matches", which shows that organised clubs did exist in England in some form as early as the 1870s. Wisden remains a prominent name in international cricket today.

In 1888 the President of St. Louis, on returning to the United States from their European tour, remarked that "England is now educated up to American sports", and encouraged other American baseball club presidents to continue promoting the game in England. Later in 1888, John Barnes, of the Western League St. Paul club, discussed his plans to travel to England to establish a "baseball syndicate" in London, Birmingham and other large cities.

In 1889 the wealthy Albert Goodwill Spalding used his position as a former star player and as a leading sporting goods supplier to arrange yet another tour of the United Kingdom by American baseball stars including the Chicago White Stockings, building on the earlier tours in the past decades. As with previous tours the cricket establishment of England was used to promote baseball, with the Prince of Wales one of the "very large number of spectators" to witness the game at the Oval, and over 8,000 attended a game at Lord's. On arriving at Bristol, Spalding paid tribute to the English cricket star W. G. Grace, "the best known Englishman in the world".

This tour led to a number of new baseball clubs springing up, such as York Baseball Club, formed at Stotts Refreshment Rooms in Parliament Street as early as March 1889. The most notable of these new clubs was formed 1890, in Derby, as Ley's Recreation Club, by Francis Ley, a local man who had experienced the game on a trip to the United States. Following their first ever game (as Ley's Recreation Club) Ley began to appeal for "professionals aged 20 to 25" and "cricketers who can field smartly" to attend Ley's Recreation Centre to form a club, in March 1890 and Ley's Recreation Club became Derby Baseball Club. Despite evidence showing clubs such as York were formed slightly earlier than or at the same time as Derby, Ley erroneously claimed "we were really the first club formed in Great Britain" when discussing Derby in 1890.

Ley, who certainly had "introduced baseball amongst his employees" and was instrumental in providing superb facilities at Derby, was not in attendance in October 1889, when noted supporters of a new National League of Baseball of Great Britain met at the Criterion, London, to formally establish the new baseball association, though he was elected as a provisional officer. Representatives of Preston North End, Gloucester County Cricket Club, Essex County Cricket Club, Staffordshire County Cricket Club, Aston Villa and the National Rounders Association all were represented and elected as officers to the association, with Newton Crane elected to the chair.

The new association quickly moved to establish a headquarters at 38 Holborn Viaduct, London, from where it would agree on and promote a set of rules by which the new National League would be played. By July 1890 it was estimated that there were over 90 baseball clubs in England alone, with Derby Baseball Club being widely believed to be the best professional club in England. Yorkshire proved to be a surprising hotbed of baseball by 1890 when it was reported that "there are more baseball clubs in Yorkshire than in any other county in England." It was not totally unexpected when the Secretary of Essex County Cricket Club, Morton Peto Betts, resigned his position to take up the role of Secretary of the newly formed Baseball Association of Great Britain, in July 1890.

Aston Villa, now known exclusively as a football club, won the only professional baseball championship in 1890. The competition was hindered by poor weather and disappointing crowds and made a loss for its investors. Aston Villa's win was not without controversy, however, with both Aston Villa and Preston North End being found guilty of cheating during the season. For much of the season Derby Baseball Club did lead the championship, however, pressure from other teams in the league over the number of American players on the Derby team and low attendances led to Derby being expelled before the end of the season, though at the time the club insisted they had "retired" as champions, despite evidence to the contrary.

In response to the accusations against Derby of employing too many talented American baseball players, Ley wrote letters to editors of newspapers to state "Derby Baseball Club is the only one of the four League clubs to have not imported professional players from America" and went to lengths to point out the lack of support Spalding provided to Derby compared to the other clubs, which he was a major shareholder in. Ironically, given the finger pointing at Ley for employing too many talented Americans, of the various American baseball players sent across to coach and play baseball in England, in the 1890 season, the most prominent was arguably Preston North End captain Leech Maskrey, who had played Major League Baseball. In August 1890 the Preston club organised a presentation for their captain, who was returning to the United States. Meanwhile, Spalding turned his attention to establishing collegiate baseball in the United Kingdom with very little success.

In March 1890 Edinburgh Northern Baseball Club began to meet for practice and Spalding's influence was obvious when The Spalding Baseball Club of Aberdeen sprung to life in July 1890, their headquarters being at 59 Princes Street. By August 1890 the financial backing of Spalding resulted in two local rivals emerging in Aberdeen, the Spalding Baseball Club and Aberdeen Baseball Club, who played at The Links. The two competed for the Spalding 50 guinea Challenge Cup and the right to take on the University Baseball Club of Edinburgh, evidence of Spalding's desire to establish collegiate baseball in the United Kingdom. Wales, possibly due to the continued popularity of British or Welsh Baseball, was slower to adopt the American game. In April 1893 The Cardiff Central were formed, and claimed to organise "the first game of American baseball played in South Wales." They were based at Grangetown.

The Golden Age and Postwar Decline
Baseball's peak popularity in Britain was in the years immediately preceding World War II. A resurgence of professional baseball occurred in parts of the United Kingdom during the 1930s and baseball enjoyed it’s heyday before the Second World War, but the outbreak of war led to a decline. In this era professional baseball teams often shared grounds with football clubs  and rugby league clubs, and drew crowds of up to 10,000 spectators per game. In 1933, in response to a challenge from Major League Baseball's National League President, John Haydler, the wealthy British gambling tycoon, Sir John Moores, established the National Baseball Association and continued to fund the establishment of amateur and professional leagues in England.

Once again American and Canadian expatriates swelled the rosters of the semi-profesional clubs, with a number of the Canadian professionals going on to represent the Great Britain national team. With this golden age UK baseball achieved a major milestone, in 1938, with the victory of the Great Britain national baseball team over the United States, in the Baseball World Cup. The series was created by Sir John Moores, with the 1939 Amateur World Series competition initially being named the John Moore's Cup.

With the backing of Sir John Moores a Great Britain team was given financial support to compete in the 1939 series, in Havana, as defending champions. In doing so they would have become the first national representative team to compete outside the United Kingdom but the outbreak of the Second World War interrupted the development of British baseball, the team withdrew and the sport entered into decline. Following the war, in July 1951, Wolsley Athletic (Birmingham) became the first baseball team from the United Kingdom to play in continental Europe, in an official game, in Belgium.

At present
As of the 2021 season, there were 90 teams from 48 baseball clubs actively participating in leagues, and 1,500 adult and Junior (under 18) players competing for clubs based across a wide geographic area, of the island of Great Britain. Despite being a constituent nation of the United Kingdom, domestic baseball in Northern Ireland is affiliated to Baseball Ireland for practical reasons.  Northern Ireland's only team, the Belfast Northstars, play in the Irish Adult League. Despite this quirk, Northern Irish born players such as P.J. Conlon are able to qualify to play for both Ireland and the United Kingdom internationally.

The British Baseball Federation (BBF) is the governing body for baseball in the UK and the baseball leagues.  The season runs from April until August. Affiliated baseball clubs pay annual affiliation fees to be a member of the BBF and play in the BBF Leagues and Junior Leagues. There are three leagues independent of the British Baseball Federation: the Scottish National League, run by Baseball Scotland; the Northern Baseball League containing mainly teams based in Northern England; and the South West and Wales Baseball League, representing some of the teams in the South West of England, plus one team in Wales. There is also a full Great Britain Baseball Programme which comprises the Great Britain Baseball Academy, junior national teams and Great Britain 'Seniors' Baseball Team.

The BBF league format is divided into the national divisions, consisting of four tiers from the National League, down to the Single-A league. At the end of the season, all divisions compete in post-season tournaments where the top teams from each conference play knockout matches, with the winning teams then progressing to the Championship Series. The Championship Series of the National League is best of three; the AAA, AA and A championships are single games.

The Independent leagues compete against the teams in their own leagues, and in 2017 the first Independent leagues finals weekend was held at Hull, which consisted of semi-finals between the champions of the Independent leagues and a final held the next day.  This was followed by an England v Scotland friendly All-Star game.

University baseball in the United Kingdom has also been growing, with 20 universities with clubs at the end of the 2015/16 season: Cambridge, Coventry, Durham, Edinburgh, Essex, Hull, Imperial, Leeds Beckett, Leeds Gryphons Baseball Club, Loughborough, Manchester Metropolitan University (Cheshire), Nottingham University, Nottingham Trent University, Sheffield, Southampton, Stirling, Swansea, UCL and University of East Anglia. The university season runs from September to May, the typical off-season for the sport. Without a British Universities & Colleges Sport (BUCS) league, teams compete in the National University Baseball Championships (NUBC) tournament, which happens twice a year, in the spring and the autumn and is run by BaseballSoftballUK (BSUK). The Spring 2016 Champions were Loughborough, who had won the past 3 NUBC tournaments. Despite not having a BUCS league, a Northern University Baseball League was set up for the 2015/16 season, and was planned to expand and be renamed to the National University Baseball League, and have a similar set up to the BBF leagues.

National Baseball Champions

Championships by Region

League System (2021) 
Due to the large turnover of teams (from baseball currently not being a professional sport in the United Kingdom), the league structure changes every season. For 2021, the format is the following:

2021 Clubs
Note: This list does not contain clubs who failed to opt in to the 2021 league system and are officially listed as inactive. Youth teams are also not included.

See also
Baseball awards#United Kingdom
Baseball awards#Europe
British Baseball

References

External links
BBF (British Baseball Federation)
Great Britain National Baseball Team
Project Cobb, the Project for the Chronicling of British Baseball.
Great Britain Baseball Scorers Association, the home of baseball scoring in the UK.

American expatriate baseball players in the United Kingdom
Baseball in the United Kingdom
British baseball players
Canadian expatriate baseball players in the United Kingdom
Great Britain national baseball team
 
 
 
History of baseball in the United Kingdom
Major League Baseball players from the United Kingdom
National Baseball Hall of Fame inductees from the United Kingdom